La Vieille-Lyre is a commune in the Eure department in Normandy in northern France. On 1 January 2019, the former commune Champignolles was merged into La Vieille-Lyre.

Population

See also
Communes of the Eure department

References

Communes of Eure